Major Frank Hamer MC with Bar (25 June 1919 – 2 April 2009) was a British Army officer and group personnel director of Cadbury Schweppes.

Early life
He was educated at Bolton School and St Catharine's College, Cambridge.

During The War
Hamer was awarded his first MC at the Second Battle of El Alamein while a lieutenant in the 4th Durham Survey Regiment RA.

He was awarded the bar to his MC after the invasion of Sicily while surveying German positions.

After The War
Hamer returned to Cambridge and finished off his studies also collecting a Blue for soccer, to go with his freshman Blue in athletics he gained before the war.  After his studies he moved to Birmingham taking a job at Cadbury, ending his career as the group personnel director of Cadbury Schweppes.

References

Telegraph obituary of Major Frank Hamer
Times obituary of Major Frank Hamer

1919 births
2009 deaths
British Army personnel of World War II
People educated at Bolton School
Alumni of St Catharine's College, Cambridge
People from Bolton
Royal Artillery officers
Recipients of the Military Cross